The 10th Transportation Battalion is a transportation battalion of the United States Army first constituted in 1942. The 10th Transportation is a subordinate unit of the 7th Transportation Brigade.

Lineage
Constituted 6 July 1942 in the Army of the United States as Headquarters and Headquarters Company, 10th Port of Embarkation

Activated 25 July 1942 at the San Francisco Port of Embarkation, California

Converted and redesignated 7 November 1942 as the 10th Port Headquarters and Headquarters Company, Transportation Corps

Inactivated 31 January 1947 in Italy

Redesignated 23 August 1954 as Headquarters and Headquarters Detachment, 10th Transportation Battalion, and allotted to the Regular Army

Activated 2 September 1954 at Fort Eustis, Virginia

Reorganized and redesignated 30 November 1971 as Headquarters and Headquarters Company, 10th Transportation Battalion

Campaign participation credit
World War II: Sicily; North Apennines; Rome-Arno

Vietnam: Defense; Counteroffensive; Counteroffensive, Phase II; Counteroffensive, Phase III; Tet Counteroffensive; Counteroffensive, Phase IV; Counteroffensive, Phase V; Counteroffensive, Phase VI; Tet 69/Counteroffensive; Summer-Fall 1969; Winter-Spring 1970; Sanctuary Counteroffensive; Counteroffensive, Phase VII; Consolidation I

Southwest Asia: Defense of Saudi Arabia; Liberation and Defense of Kuwait; Cease-Fire

Decorations
Meritorious Unit Commendation (Army) for EUROPEAN THEATER
Meritorious Unit Commendation (Army) for VIETNAM 1965–1966
Meritorious Unit Commendation (Army) for VIETNAM 1967–1968
Meritorious Unit Commendation (Army) for SOUTHWEST ASIA

References

External links
 10th Transportation Battalion

0010